I Will Always Love You: The Best of Whitney Houston is a posthumous greatest hits album by American recording artist Whitney Houston. The album was released on November 13, 2012 via RCA Records.

Content and release
I Will Always Love You: The Best of Whitney Houston is Houston's second greatest hits collection to receive a worldwide release (her two prior compilations, Love, Whitney and The Ultimate Collection were only given limited releases in certain European territories). The album features remastered versions of hits from all of Houston's studio and soundtrack albums, with the exception of her fifth studio album, Just Whitney (2002). The tracks featured on I Will Always Love You: The Best of Whitney Houston appear either as their original album versions or as radio edits, in contrast with Whitney: The Greatest Hits, which featured many of Houston's hits in remixed form, a decision which drew some controversy among fans and critics. Internationally, the compilation was released in both standard and deluxe versions. In North America, the album was issued as a single-disc release, which contains the same track listing as disc one of the international deluxe edition. An alternate two-disc edition of the album was released in North America, available only through HSN. This version contains the standard 18-track version of the album, with the second disc comprising five duets Houston recorded with other artists. The album also includes new liner notes written by Clive Davis.

Among the tracks are two previously unreleased songs, a new composition titled "Never Give Up" and a new version of "I Look to You", recorded as a duet with R. Kelly, who wrote the song for Houston in 2009 and performed it at her funeral service earlier in 2012. "I Look to You" was released on September 25, 2012 as the first single from the album. On November 6, 2012, "Never Give Up" was released as a lyric video on Whitney Houston's official YouTube (Vevo) channel.

At the 2013 44th NAACP Image Awards, the album won two awards in the 'Outstanding Album' and 'Outstanding Song' categories, the latter of which was for "I Look To You".

In 2021, Houston's official website announced that the album would be released on vinyl on October 29. The double vinyl includes an additional track, a remix of "Higher Love", a collaboration between Houston and Norwegian DJ Kygo, which was released in 2019 to moderate worldwide success.<ref>{{Cite web|title=Whitney Houston's I Will Always Love You: The Best of Whitney Houston' On Vinyl! - Whitney Houston Official Site|url=https://www.whitneyhouston.com/news/i-will-always-love-you-the-best-of-whitney-houston-on-vinyl/|website=Whitney Houston Official Site|language=en-US}}</ref> The original version of "Higher Love" first appeared as a bonus track on the Japanese edition of Houston's third studio album, I'm Your Baby Tonight (1990).

Commercial performance
The week of its release, the album peaked at number 14 on the Billboard 200 and number 2 on Billboard Top R&B/Hip Hop Albums. On March 3, 2020, the album was certified Gold by the RIAA for selling over 500,000 copies. The album has spent 139 weeks on the Billboard 200, making it Houston's third longest-charting album of her career, one of the longest-charting albums by a woman, the fourth-longest charting compilation album by a woman and one of the longest charting compilations ever in the history of Billboard as well as the longest charting compilation by a black female artist. Peaking at number eight on Billboard Top R&B Albums chart, the album has spent 201 weeks on that chart, longer than any other female compilation second only to H.E.R.'s 2017 compilation. In the UK, it peaked at number 13 in 2023 and has been certified Gold and has spent 90 weeks on the chart, making it her fifth longest charting album in that country.

Track listing

 Notes 
  – On the 2021 reissue, the duet version of "I Look to You" was replaced with the album version, likely due to the sexual abuse allegations and subsequent charges raised against R. Kelly in the years following its release.

Personnel

Michael Masser – producer
Narada Michael Walden – producer
David Foster – producer
Kashif – producer
L.A. Reid – producer
Babyface – producer
Rodney Jerkins – producer
David Cole – producer
Robert Clivillés – producer
Louis Biancaniello – producer
Wyclef Jean – producer
Jerry Duplessis – producer

Teddy Riley – producer
John Benitez – producer
Jermaine Jackson – producer
Tom Keane – producer
Mervyn Warren – producer
Brian Michael-Cox – producer
Jermaine Dupri – producer
Carsten Schack – producer
Kenneth Karlin – producer
Alicia Keys – producer 
Kaseem Dean – producer
R. Kelly – producer
Chris Gehringer – compilation mastering at Sterling Sound

Charts

Weekly charts

Year-end charts

Certifications

Accolades
NAACP Image Awards

|-
|  style="width:35px; text-align:center;" rowspan="2"|2013 || "I Look to You" (with R. Kelly) || Best Outstanding Song || 
|-
|| I Will Always Love You: The Best of Whitney Houston'' || Best Outstanding Album || 
|-

Release history

References

External links
 I Will Always Love You: The Best of Whitney Houston at Allmusic
 I Will Always Love You: The Best of Whitney Houston at Discogs

2012 greatest hits albums
Whitney Houston compilation albums
Compilation albums published posthumously
RCA Records compilation albums